Ellen White may refer to:

Ellen White (footballer) (born 1989), English international footballer (soccer player)
Ellen White (Snuneymuxw First Nation) (1922–2018), Canadian Snuneymuxw First Nation elder and author
Ellen Emerson White, American author
Ellen G. White (1827–1915), American author and co-founder of the Seventh-day Adventist Church